The 10-km-long Guayaques chain of N-S-trending rhyodacitic lava domes runs across the Chile-Bolivia border about 10 km. east of the Cerro Toco - Purico Complex.

See also 
 List of volcanoes in Bolivia
 List of volcanoes in Chile

External links 
 

Volcanoes of Potosí Department
Mountains of Chile
Volcanoes of Antofagasta Region